2002 Denmark Open is a darts tournament, which took place in Denmark in 2002.

Results

References

2002 in darts
2002 in Danish sport
Darts in Denmark